Nandivarman II (718 CE – 796 CE) was a Pallava ruler who ruled in South India. Sen states Nandivarman reigned from 731 CE – 796 CE and built the Vaikuntha-Perumal Temple. He was born in the country of Champa (modern day Vietnam) into a local dynasty of Pallava origin and was elected as a Pallava king at the age of 13.

Background 

Paramesvaravarman II was succeeded by 12 year old Nandivarman II Pallavamalla who belonged to the collateral line of Pallavas called the Kadavas. The latter  were the descendants of Bhimavarman, the brother of Simhavishnu. Hiranyavarman, the father of Nandivarman Pallavamalla is said to have belonged to the Kadavakula in epigraphs. Nandivarman II himself is described as "one who was born to raise the prestige of the Kadava family". He is credited to have built the Tiru Parameswara Vinnagaram.

The term Kaduvetti in Tamil means destroyer or clearer of forests as the Pallavas like their ancestor Mukkanti Kaduvetti alias Trilochana Pallava were known to often clear forests and introduce civilization by settling Brahmins and other communities.

The previous ruler Paramesvaravarman II did not have an heir so the ministers, feudatories and advisors of the kingdom took an expedition to neighboring kingdoms and distant lands to find a suitable prince of the original line. Upon reaching Kambujadesa, modern day Cambodia and southern Vietnam, they finally identified Nandivarman II as belonging to the original line and willing to ascend the throne. Accordingly, he was brought and then installed on the throne of the Pallava kingdom.

References

External links 

720 births
796 deaths
Pallava kings